Maxim Bryanov (born 12 April 1979) is a Russian judoka.

Achievements

References

1979 births
Living people
Russian male judoka